Platocoelotes is a genus of East Asian funnel weavers first described by X. P. Wang in 2002. They are all found in China except for Platocoelotes uenoi, found in Japan.

Species
 it contains twenty-three species:

Platocoelotes ampulliformis Liu & Li, 2008 – China
Platocoelotes bifidus Yin, Xu & Yan, 2010 – China
Platocoelotes brevis Liu & Li, 2008 – China
Platocoelotes daweishanensis Xu & Li, 2008 – China
Platocoelotes fanjingshan Jiang, Chen & Zhang, 2018 – China
Platocoelotes furcatus Liu & Li, 2008 – China
Platocoelotes globosus Xu & Li, 2008 – China
Platocoelotes icohamatoides (Peng & Wang, 1997) – China
Platocoelotes imperfectus Wang & Jäger, 2007 – China
Platocoelotes impletus (Peng & Wang, 1997) – China
Platocoelotes kailiensis Wang, 2003 – China
Platocoelotes latus Xu & Li, 2008 – China
Platocoelotes lichuanensis (Chen & Zhao, 1998) – China
Platocoelotes luoi Chen & Li, 2015 – China
Platocoelotes paralatus Xu & Li, 2008 – China
Platocoelotes polyptychus Xu & Li, 2007 – China
Platocoelotes qinglinensis Chen & Li, 2015 – China
Platocoelotes shuiensis Chen & Li, 2015 – China
Platocoelotes strombuliformis Liu & Li, 2008 – China
Platocoelotes tianyangensis Chen & Li, 2015 – China
Platocoelotes uenoi (Yamaguchi & Yaginuma, 1971) – Japan
Platocoelotes xianwuensis Chen & Li, 2015 – China
Platocoelotes zhuchuandiani Liu & Li, 2012 – China

References

External links

Agelenidae
Araneomorphae genera
Spiders of China